John Alfred Arnesby Brown (20 March 1866 – 1955) was an English footballer who played in The Football League for Notts County. His only appearance for Notts County came in a heavy 9–1 defeat to Aston Villa in September 1888.

Early career
Associated with County for five years prior to their Football League entry, John Brown had been a regular until mid–season 1887–88. In this campaign his record of ten goals in 14 friendly matches included two separate instances of four goals in a match against Leek and Aston Villa, both in October 1887.

1888-1889 Season
He was rather less successful when he made his sole appearance in a Football League match. This was against Aston Villa at Wellington Road on 29 September 1888, Brown playing on the wing. Reported to have made "An even worse exhibition than usual," the Magpies were four goals in arrears at half–time. They pulled one back – through an own goal – but then "never had another look in" as Villa added a further five. The 9–1 score–line still remains on the record books as Notts' record Football league defeat. On two subsequent occasions they went under by the same score–line, against Blackburn Rovers in 1889 and against Portsmouth in 1927.

1889 onwards

John Brown made four appearances for Notts County (one League and three FA Cup) and scored one FA Cup goal. John Brown lived a very long life passing away at the age of 89 in the County of Norfolk in Eastern England.

References

1866 births
1955 deaths
English footballers
Association football forwards
Notts County F.C. players
English Football League players